The "Preußenlied" ("Song of Prussia," in German) served as the national anthem of the Kingdom of Prussia, from 1830 to 1840. Because of its opening lyrics, it has also been known as "Ich bin ein Preuße, kennt ihr meine Farben?" ("I am a Prussian, know ye my colours?").

History 

Bernard Thiersch (1793–1855), the director of a Dortmund gymnasium, wrote the first six verses of the song in Halberstadt to honor the birthday of King Frederick William III of Prussia in 1830. The melody was composed in 1832 by August Neithardt (1793–1861), the Royal Music Director of the 2nd Garde-Grenadier-Regiment of the Prussian Army. Dr. F. Th. Schneider added the seventh verse in 1851. (However, the sixth verse below refers to a battle at Dybbøl that took place in 1864, i.e. apparently after the song was written!)

The "Preußenlied" replaced the previous anthem, and was then succeeded by "Heil dir im Siegerkranz".

Because almost all Germans east of the Oder were expelled after World War II, the "Preußenlied" is sometimes sung by refugee organizations, such as the Territorial Association of East Prussia. It almost always has nationalistic undertones.

Lyrics

References

External links 
Preußenlied at Preußen-chronik.de   ***link not found 
Preußenlied at Ingeb.org 
Sheet music

19th-century songs
Historical national anthems
German anthems
Culture of Prussia
European anthems
Songs about Germany